Margaritis is a Greek surname. The female version is Margariti (Greek: Μαργαρίτη). It may refer to:

Alexandros Margaritis (born 1984), Greek-German racing driver
Dimitrios Margaritis, fighter in the Greek War of Independence
Filippos Margaritis, merchant, member of the Filiki Eteria
Filippos Margaritis (1839-1892), Greek photographer
Giorgos Margaritis (born 1991), Greek footballer
Yannis Margaritis, Greek theatre director

See also 
Margariti, a municipality in Greece
Margariti, a settlement in Greece

Greek-language surnames
Surnames